Robin Singh may refer to:

 Robin Singh (cricketer) (born 1963), Indian cricketer
 Robin Singh Jr. (born 1970), Indian cricketer
 Robin Singh (footballer) (born 1990), Indian footballer
 Robin Singh, co-founder of Peepal Farm